"Love Me, I'm a Liberal" is a satirical song by Phil Ochs, an American singer-songwriter. Originally released on his 1966 live album, Phil Ochs in Concert, "Love Me, I'm a Liberal" was soon one of Ochs's most popular concert staples. 

Introducing the song on the live album, Ochs said:

In every American community there are varying shades of political opinion. One of the shadiest of these is the liberals. An outspoken group on many subjects, ten degrees to the left of center in good times, ten degrees to the right of center if it affects them personally. Here, then, is a lesson in safe logic.

"Love Me, I'm a Liberal" is sung from the perspective of an American liberal.  In the first verse, the singer laments the assassinations of Medgar Evers and President John F. Kennedy, but says Malcolm X got what he deserved.  Each verse ends with the refrain, "So love me, love me, love me, I'm a liberal." In the song's other verses, the singer says he supports the Civil Rights Movement and "love[s] Puerto Ricans and Negros as long as they don't move next door", but adds that if somebody suggests busing the singer's children to integrate their schools, he "hope[s] the cops take down [their] name". In the final verse, the narrator reveals that he used to be like the listener:

According to Ochs' biographer Michael Schumacher, "Love Me, I'm a Liberal" would evoke "a strange mixture of laughter, from nervous tittering from those who recognized themselves in Phil's indictment, to open roars of approval from the radical factions in the audience." Eric Alterman describes "Love Me, I'm a Liberal" as "a scorching indictment of liberal cowardice by a bitter adversary, not the good-natured ribbing one might expect from an affectionate ally".

In 2018, Billy Bragg wrote of "Love Me, I'm a Liberal": "As with all such finely honed topical songs, the cultural references have dated somewhat. However, Ochs's description of a liberal as someone whose politics are '10 degrees to the left of centre in good times, 10 degrees to the right of centre if it affects them personally' still resonates today."

Cover versions
Several cover versions of "Love Me, I'm a Liberal" have been recorded, almost always with updated lyrics. Performers include Jello Biafra and Mojo Nixon, Kevin Devine, Gerd Schinkel, Evan Greer, John Yannis, Oscar Brand, Carly Cosgrove and Chris T-T.

References

1965 songs
Phil Ochs songs
Political songs
Songs written by Phil Ochs
Satirical songs
Liberalism in the United States